Slovakia participated at the 2018 Summer Youth Olympics in Buenos Aires, Argentina from 6 October to 18 October 2018.

Medalists

Athletics

Slovakia qualified six athletes.

Boys
Track & road events

Girls
Track & road events

Field events

Boxing

Slovakia qualified one athlete.

Girls

Canoeing

Slovakia qualified two boats based on its performance at the 2018 World Qualification Event.

Girls

Cycling

Slovakia qualified a boys' combined team based on its ranking in the Youth Olympic Games Junior Nation Rankings. They also qualified a mixed BMX racing team based on its ranking in the Youth Olympic Games BMX Junior Nation Rankings.

 Boys' combined team – 1 team of 2 athletes
 Mixed BMX racing team – 1 team of 2 athletes

Team

BMX

Judo

Slovakia qualified one athlete based on its position at the IJF cadet WRL.

Individual

Team

Futsal

Slovakia qualified the boys' team (10 athletes).

Team

 Sebastián Bačo
  Tibor Boháč
 Jakub Filip
 Kristián Medoň
 Rastislav Moravec
 Jozef Koricina
 Matúš Šlehofer
 Matúš Ševčík
 Marek Kuruc
 Kevin Kollár

Boys' tournament

Group A

Karate

Slovakia qualified one athlete based on the rankings in the Buenos Aires 2018 Olympic Standings.

Shooting

Slovakia qualified one sport shooter.

Team

Sport climbing

Slovakia qualified one sport climber based on its performance at the 2017 World Youth Sport Climbing Championships.

Swimming

Slovakia qualified four athlete based on its performance at the 17th FINA World Championships in Budapest.

Boys

Girls

Table tennis

Slovakia qualified one table tennis player based on its performance at the Road to Buenos Aires (Africa) series.

Weightlifting

Slovakia qualified one athlete.

References

2018 in Slovak sport
Nations at the 2018 Summer Youth Olympics
Slovakia at the Youth Olympics